Elvia Fernanda Torres Pérez most known as Elyfer Torres (born 15 February 1997 in Mexico), is a Mexican actress. Her first major role was in the Telemundo telenovela's Betty en NY (2019). Although previously she stood out for series like La rosa de Guadalupe (2012–2017), La Piloto (2018), El secreto de Selena (2018), and Nicky Jam: El Ganador (2018). Torres began her artistic training as a child taking workshops at the Centro de Educación Artística of Televisa. later she specialized in acting for cinema at the renowned New York Film Academy in Los Angeles; returning to Mexico to continue her training at the CasAzul of Argos school, and finally, she finished her classical dance training at the Royal Academy of Dance in England.

Filmography

Film roles

Television roles

Music videos

References

External links 
 

1997 births
Living people
Mexican telenovela actresses
Mexican film actresses
Mexican female models
Actresses from Mexico City
21st-century Mexican actresses